San Cristóbal Cucho is a town and municipality in the San Marcos department of Guatemala.It was found on 11 October 1825.  It was annexed to San Pedro Sacatepéquez, in 1935, but it was named a municipality again on 12 July 1945.

History 
The region was discovered by the Spaniards in the 16th century; soldiers under captain Juan de Dios y Cardona's command found the place.  Before that, it had been populated by Mam people.  After the arrival of the Spaniards, it was established as an Indian reduction and eventually raised to a municipality on 11 October 1811, and named "San Cristóbal Cucho". It is located to the south of San Marcos Department municipal capital.

Population 
As of 2009, San Cristóbal Cucho had 19.443 inhabitants and almost 4.000 home; it has 56 km2 and sits 2730 m above sea level.

Economy 
Economic activity is mostly geared to agriculture, cattle, and commerce.

Political division 
The municipality has one town, five villages, seven settlements and four rural settlements (Spanish:cantones).

Climate

San Cristóbal Cucho has 60% relative humidity on average and temperate climate (Köppen:Cwb).

Geographic location

San Cristóbal Cucho is practically surround by San Marcos Department municipalities, except on its East side, where it borders with San Juan Ostuncalco, a Quetzaltenango municipality.

See also

Notes and references

References

Bibliography

External links
Some information (in Spanish)

Municipalities of the San Marcos Department